Dreissena caspia is a species of bivalves belonging to the family Dreissenidae.

The species is found in Central Asia.

References

Dreissenidae
Bivalves of Asia
Bivalves described in 1855
IUCN Red List critically endangered species